Vlastimil Burda (born November 4, 1975) is a Czech former swimmer, who specialized in long-distance freestyle events. He is a single-time Olympian (2000) and a resident athlete for USK Praha in Prague. While studying in the United States, Burda held two NCAA championship titles, and a school record (4:22.58) in the 400-yard freestyle since 2002, as a member of Cal State Bakersfield Roadrunners.

Burda competed in a long-distance freestyle double at the 2000 Summer Olympics in Sydney. He cleared a FINA A-standard entry time of 3:53.36 (400 m freestyle) from the European Championships in Helsinki, Finland. In the 400 m freestyle, held on the first day of the Games, Burda challenged seven other swimmers in heat five, including Australia's overwhelming favorite Grant Hackett. Nearly a week later, in the 1500 m freestyle, Burda placed twenty-sixth on the morning prelims. Swimming in heat one, he stormed home with an easy triumph against Chinese Taipei's Li Yun-lun and Kyrgyzstan's Ivan Ivanov, in a lifetime best of 15:33.25.

References

1975 births
Living people
Olympic swimmers of the Czech Republic
Swimmers at the 2000 Summer Olympics
Czech male freestyle swimmers
Cal State Bakersfield Roadrunners men's swimmers
People from Litoměřice
Sportspeople from the Ústí nad Labem Region